The North Norfolk Coast Site of Special Scientific Interest (SSSI) is an internationally important protected area in Norfolk, England. The SSSI is a long, narrow strip of coastal land that starts between Old Hunstanton and Holme-next-the-Sea, and runs east for about 43 km (27 mi) to Kelling. The southern boundary runs roughly west to east except where it detours around towns and villages, and never crosses the A149 coast road. It has an area of 7,700 ha (19,027 acres), and is additionally protected through Natura 2000, Special Protection Area (SPA) and Ramsar listings; it is also part of the Norfolk Coast Area of Outstanding Natural Beauty (AONB). Scolt Head Island and the coast from the Holkham National Nature Reserve to Salthouse are a Biosphere Reserve.

The North Norfolk Coast SSSI contains a variety of habitats including foreshore, shingle,  salt marshes, reed bed and pasture, and is important primarily for the  breeding populations of nationally and internationally scarce bird species, and also the large numbers of wildfowl it supports in winter. More than three-quarters of the SSSI has been acquired as nature reserves by conservation organisations, whose properties also hold several rare or endangered invertebrates and plants. The mixed pattern of ownership of the ten reserves existing in 2012 reflects the availability of land for purchase or management over the preceding century, and the differing priorities of the various bodies.

Overview
The North Norfolk Coast SSSI was created in 1986 from preexisting SSSIs at Blakeney Point, Holme Dunes, Cley Marshes, Salthouse Marshes (all designated in 1954), Morston Saltmarshes, Brancaster Manor (1968), Stiffkey Saltmarshes  (1969), Thornham Marshes (1972) and Titchwell Marsh (1973), together with the national nature reserves (NNRs) at Scolt Head Island and Holkham, and substantial formerly undesignated areas. It has a wide variety of habitats. Bare mud, sand and shingle characterise the intertidal zone along the whole of the coast, although higher areas may have algae or eelgrass that are grazed by ducks and geese in winter. The salt marshes which form on sheltered parts of the coast, in the lee of islands, or behind spits are described in the SSSI notification document as "among the best in Europe ... flora is exceptionally diverse". Sand dunes occur at several places along the coast, but the best examples are at Holme Dunes, Holkham, Blakeney Point, and Scolt Head Island. The latter two sites are also important for geomorphology research purposes as structures consisting mainly of shingle ridges. Reed beds are fairly localised, but substantial areas occur at Titchwell Marsh, Brancaster and Cley Marshes. Grassland is represented by livestock grazing pasture reclaimed from former salt marsh, with wetter areas at Cley and Salthouse marshes. Woodland is limited in the SSSI, although a belt of Corsican pine planted at Holkham has provided shelter to allow other trees and shrubs to become established.

The SSSI is designated as a Special Protection Area for birds because its variety of coastal habitats give it year-round importance for a number of species. The breeding colonies of Sandwich terns and little terns, especially those at Blakeney and Scolt Head Island, are of  European importance, and the coast is of national significance for common terns, pied avocets and reed bed specialists like western marsh harriers, Eurasian bitterns and bearded reedlings. The SSSI also holds large numbers of wintering ducks and geese, the endangered water vole, and scarce species like natterjack toad, starlet sea anemone, lesser centaury, sea barley and bee orchid.

Because of the wildlife importance of the area, much of what is now the SSSI has been protected in nature reserves, starting in 1912 when Charles Rothschild bought Blakeney Point and donated it to the National Trust, which has managed it since. A 2005 survey at six North Norfolk coastal sites (Snettisham, Titchwell, Holkham, Morston Quay, Blakeney and Cley) found that 39 per cent of visitors gave birdwatching as the main purpose of their visit. The 7.7 million day visitors and 5.5 million who made overnight stays in the area in 1999 are estimated to have spent £122 million, and created the equivalent of 2,325 full-time jobs. Titchwell Marsh (Royal Society for the Protection of Birds), Cley Marshes (Norfolk Wildlife Trust) and Holkham National Nature Reserve each attract 100,000 or more visitors annually. The SSSI ownership outside the listed areas is a mixture of private land and areas owned by the National Trust or wildfowling associations which are not actively managed as nature reserves.

Reserves 
The ten reserves existing in 2012 had a combined area of 6,016 ha (14,863 acres), 78 percent of the SSSI. Although they have no legal protection beyond that of privately owned land, they may have more active management or provide visitor facilities. The mixed ownership reflects land becoming available for purchase or management at various times, and the differing priorities of the conservation bodies.

Notes 
The grid reference is based on the British national grid reference system, and is the system used by the Ordnance Survey. Data is given for the main access point. Holkham National Nature Reserve has two road accesses.

References

Cited texts 

 
 
 
  (automatic download).

External links 

Natural England's interactive map of the SSSI

Birdwatching sites in England
Coastal features of Norfolk
Nature reserves in Norfolk